Pierre Petit (22 January 1930 – 4 February 2022) was a Martinican politician who was elected to the French National Assembly in 1993. Born in Martinique, France, he died on 4 February 2022, at the age of 92.

References

External links 
 page on the French National Assembly website

1930 births
2022 deaths
Deputies of the 10th National Assembly of the French Fifth Republic
Deputies of the 11th National Assembly of the French Fifth Republic
Martiniquais politicians
People from Le Morne-Rouge
Rally for the Republic politicians